Calcarisporium is a genus of fungi in the order Hypocreales. Species are typically fungicolous, parasitizing other fungal fruit bodies.

References

Hypocreales genera